Giovanna d'Acquapendente was a 15th-century noblewoman from the Kingdom of Naples. She was known as 'la Colombina' and was the lover of Francesco I Sforza for the seventeen years between the death of his first wife Polissena Ruffo (1420) and his second marriage to Bianca Maria Visconti, daughter of Filippo Maria Visconti (1441). Visconti took Francesco's illegitimate children under her wing after the marriage.

Giovanna lived at the castle in Fermo with her children until Francesco was made lord of the March of Ancona. From then on she lived with her children in the castles at Abbiategrasso, Lodi, Melegnano, Pavia and Binasco, taking part in hunts, banquets and processions.

Issue 
She had five confirmed illegitimate children with Francesco, of whom three reached adulthood:
Polissena, died in early infancy
Polissena Sforza (1428–1449), married Sigismondo Pandolfo Malatesta
Sforza (1430–1433)
Sforza Secondo Sforza (1433–1492 or 1493), count of Borgonuovo, married Antonia del Verme;
Drusiana Sforza  (30 September 1437 - 29 June 1474), married  Jacopo Piccinino.

Other sources  also attribute two more of Francesco's illegitimate children to her:
Tristano (1422/24-1477), married Beatrice d'Este, illegitimate daughter of Niccolò III d'Este
Isotta (1425-1485/87), married Andrea Matteo d'Acquaviva

References (in Italian) 

House of Sforza
Mistresses of Italian royalty
15th-century Neapolitan people
15th-century Italian women